The Pinecrest Formation is a geologic formation in Florida. It preserves mostly invertebrate fossils of the Pliocene.

See also

 List of fossiliferous stratigraphic units in Florida

References
 

Geologic formations of Florida